Linepithema keiteli is a species of ant in the genus Linepithema. Described by Forel in 1907, the species is endemic to Haiti.

References

Dolichoderinae
Hymenoptera of North America
Insects described in 1907